Lars Erik Einar Gustafsson (17 May 1936 – 3 April 2016) was a Swedish poet, novelist, and scholar.

Life and career
Gustafsson was born in Västerås, completed his secondary education at the Västerås Gymnasium and continued to Uppsala University, where he studied literature, aesthetics, sociology and philosophy. In 1960, he received a licentiate degree in philosophy. In 1978, he was awarded a PhD in theoretical philosophy with a dissertation on speech and literature. He later served for four years on the university's board of regents (1994-1998).

Already by 1960 Gustafsson was publishing novels and poetry regularly. In addition to his literary work, he was editor-in-chief of the renowned literary journal Bonniers Litterära Magasin from 1962 to 1972 . He soon established international contacts, notably to the German authors in Group 47. In 1972, through a DAAD fellowship he came to West Berlin, where he lived for two years. During this period, he also traveled extensively, among other places to Australia, Singapore, Japan, Israel, and the United States. Throughout his career, he attended and participated in many international academic and cultural events. John Updike described Gustafsson as "the enviably ideal conferee, a red-bearded fish never out of water, loving books, ideas, and discourse equally, and everywhere adept."

Having been invited to visit the University of Texas at Austin by its Germanic Studies department in 1972 and again in 1974, and because Austin was his wife's hometown he moved there in 1983, where he served at first as adjunct professor in Germanic Studies, later as professor, then Distinguished Professor, in the Plan II Honors program, teaching philosophy and creative writing. He returned to Sweden in 2003 while continuing to hold a research professorship in the university; in 2006, he retired. He lived in Stockholm, spending summers in Västmanland. He died at the age of 79 on 3 April 2016.

Gustafsson was married three times: in 1961 to Madeleine Gustafsson (two children); in 1982 to Alexandra Chasnoff (two children); in 2005 to Agneta Blomqvist. In 1981 Gustafsson converted to Judaism.

In May 2009, Lars Gustafsson declared that he would vote for the Pirate Party in the upcoming elections for the European Parliament. However, in August 2010 he left the Pirate Party in protest of its cooperation with the WikiLeaks portal, which he accused of delivering death lists for the Taliban.

Writing
Gustafsson published poetry, novels, short stories, critical essays, and editorials. He gained international recognition as a Swedish writer. He won a John Simon Guggenheim Memorial Foundation Fellowship for poetry in 1994. He was nominated for the Nobel Prize in Literature (the year is unknown as the Nobel Committee keeps nominations secret for 50 years). He won the 2016 International Nonino Prize in Italy.

Gustafsson's novels and poetry have been translated into fifteen languages, the most often translated being the novels The Death of a Beekeeper (En biodlares död), Bernard Foy's Third Castling (Bernard Foys tredje rockad), and Afternoon of a Tiler (En kakelsättares eftermiddag). Harold Bloom includes Gustafsson in The Western Canon: The Books and School of the Ages (1994, p. 557).

The Death of a Beekeeper, published in 1978, is Gustafsson's best-known novel. John Updike praised it as "a beautiful work, lyrical and bleak, resonant and terse." Ia Dübois has called it "one of his greatest works." Eva Stenskar has written that it "seems so effortless yet lyrical that only an artist at the height of his powers could've produced it." Its main theme is the agony of disease, as it follows Vesslan—a beekeeper who is dying of cancer—through entries he makes on notepads. The book's innovative structure allows Gustafsson to explore identity through its expression in a variety of forms: imagination, memory and even the mundane details of life. The book's central theme is revealed by the repeated motto of the protagonist, "We never give up. We begin anew." Gustafsson himself has described it as "A book about pain. It describes a journey into the center where pain rules—and pain can tolerate no rivals." The novel was re-published in 1984 as the last in a five-novel sequence Sprickorna i muren (The Cracks in the Wall), the other volumes being Herr Gustafsson själv, Yllet, Familjefesten, and Sigismund.

Bernard Foy's Third Castling (1986) is nearly as well known as The Death of a Beekeeper. Its settings are Sweden, Paris, Worpsewede, Germany, and Texas. The overt genre is the detective story, but there are three plots, and Bernard Foy is three separate characters: a Houston rabbi, an old Swedish poet, and a Swedish teenager. Each gradually turns into a character in the writing of the succeeding Foy. Gustafsson said that he was prompted by a “connection to Descartes' dream argument: You start with a story and it proves to be the story of a completely different person who is dreaming up the story which proves to be the story of a third person and it is all written by one or another person.”

In 1989, Gustafsson ventured into the field of science fiction and published Det sällsamma djuret från norr och andra science-fiction-berättelser. The book takes place 40,000 years into the future, when humans are extinct and the galaxy is populated by artificial intelligences. It is a philosophical exploration of life and existence and can be seen as an homage to Stanislav Lem.

Gustafsson's two major fields of interest interacted from the start of his career. In 2003, he wrote that "sometimes I cannot see any sharp boundary between [my literary work] and [my philosophical work]. I tend to regard myself as a philosopher who has turned literature into one of his tools." When asked where he finds his inspiration, Gustafsson answered "I listen. I listen and I look. Creativity knows no rules. You can get an idea for a novel from a little something someone says, or just a face you see. A rabbi once told me that when God spoke to Moses in that bush, it wasn't in a thundering voice; it was in a very weak voice. You have to listen carefully for that voice. You have to be very sharp."

In 2003, Yllet, the second novel in The Cracks in the Wall (Sprickorna i Muren) series was made into a feature film, directed by Jimmy Karlsson and starring Magnus Krepper.

While the problem of identity has been the defining theme of Gustafsson's writings, his social criticism often vexed the Swedish cultural elite. As a result, he is seen as a controversial writer in Sweden rather than as one embraced by the establishment.

In 2016, he received the Zbigniew Herbert International Literary Award.

Selected works 
Truth and Lie (Språk och Lögn. En essä om språkfilosofisk extremism i nittonde århundradet, 1978)

Novels and Stories
Sprickorna i muren (five-novel cycle)
Herr Gustafsson själv  (Mr. Gustafsson Himself 1971; not available in English)
Yllet (Yllet 1973; not available in English)
Familjefesten  (Family Reunion 1975; not available in English)
Sigismund, or the Memories of a Baroque Polish Prince  (Sigismund, ur en polsk barockfurst minnen, 1976)
The Death of a Beekeeper   (En biodlares död, 1978)
The Tennis Players  (Tennisspelarna, 1977)
Stories of Happy People  (Berättelser om lyckliga Människor, 1981)
Funeral Music for Freemasons  (Sorgemusik för frimurare, 1983)
Bernard Foy's Third Castling  (Bernard Foys tredje rockad, 1986)
Det sällsamma djuret från norr och andra science-fiction-berättelser  (Stockholm: Norstedt. Libris 7155137, 1989), not available in English 
A Tiler's Afternoon  (En kakelsättares eftermiddag, 1991)
The Tale of a Dog  (Historien med hunden, 1993)

Poetry
Selected Poems (1972; translated by Robin Fulton)
Warm Rooms and Cold (1975; translated by Yvonne L. Sandstroem)
Stillness of the World Before Bach  (1988; collection of poems selected from volumes published between 1962 and 1984, including the title volume Världens tystnad före Bach, 1982; edited by Christopher Middleton; translations by the editor, Robin Fulton, Harriett Watts, Yvonne L. Sandstroem, and Philip Martin)
Elegies and Other Poems  (2000; collection of poems selected from volumes published between 1968 and 1996; edited by Christopher Middleton; translations by the editor, Yvonne L. Sandstroem, Philip Martin, and Bill Brookshire)
A Time in Xanadu (2008; translated by John Irons)  (En tid i Xanadu, 2002)
Selected Poems (2015; collection of poems selected from volumes published between 1998 and 2012, plus unpublished poems; translated by John Irons)

See also
International Dublin Literary Award
Zbigniew Herbert International Literary Award

Notes

External links

Lars Gustafsson, College of Liberal Arts, The University of Texas at Austin, Department of Germanic Studies; includes curriculum vitae through 2002 
Per Helge, "Poetry, knowledge and unintentional science: Some reflections with regards to one theme in the poetry of Lars Gustafsson" (survey of the poetry from 1962 to 1996) 
English translations of about 50 poems on John Irons's blog: 
http://www.bookrags.com/Lars_Gustafsson

1936 births
2016 deaths
People from Västerås
Converts to Judaism
Writers from Västmanland
Swedish-language poets
Swedish-language writers
Swedish scholars and academics
Swedish Jews
Uppsala University alumni
University of Texas at Austin faculty
Selma Lagerlöf Prize winners
Litteris et Artibus recipients
Members of the Academy of Arts, Berlin
Articles containing video clips